Pradeep Kumar (1925–2001) was an Indian actor

Pradeep Kumar may refer to:

 Pradeep Kumar (singer) (born 1986), Indian playback singer and music director
 Pradeep Kumar (IAS) (born 1955), former Indian Administrative Service officer
 Pradeep Kumar (politician), Indian politician
 Pradeep Kumar (producer), Indian serial producer